Arthur Gorrie Correctional Centre is a high security Remand Centre for males, primarily accommodating individuals who a Judge or Magistrate has ordered must be held in custody as they await, and during, trial. The centre is located on the Ipswich Motorway at Wacol in the western suburbs of Brisbane, Australia. The centre's Maximum Security Unit was closed on 1 March 2013, with maximum security inmates moved to other maximum security facilities within the State.

The centre is relatively modern with TVs, showers and toilets in all rooms and shared dining facilities.

Managed by the Queensland Corrective Services the Arthur Gorrie Correctional Centre was the second of Queensland's privately operated non-government prisons (previously managed by Geo Group), sharing the notation with the Southern Queensland Correctional Centre (previously managed by Serco). Both of which were announced to be transitioned to be managed by Queensland Corrective Services in 2019.

The facility is named after Arthur Gorrie.

In June 2018, the contract for the facility was up for tender.

In 2020, after more than 28 years, Arthur Gorrie Correctional Centre transitioned from GEO Group services to Queensland Corrective Services.

Violence and overcrowding
In June 2018, a report by the Australian Broadcasting Corporation revealed widespread inmate violence, overcrowding and brutality by prison guards at Arthur Gorrie Correctional Centre. The rate of prisoner assault in 2016 was more than twice that of the next most violent prison in the country.

Notable prisoners
Brenden Abbott
John Howard Amundsen
Peter Foster

See also

 List of Australian prisons
 Punishment in Australia

References

External links
Satellite image of prison
Arthur Gorrie Correctional Centre at the Department of Community Safety webpage

Prisons in Queensland
Maximum security prisons in Australia
1992 establishments in Australia
Wacol, Queensland
GEO Group